Gustave Frédéric Michel (1851–1924) was a French sculptor, and medallist, according to Marina Warner "one of the most famous sculptors of the first decades of this (twentieth) century in France," although virtually unknown today. He also taught sculpture; among his pupils was the American Edith Howland.

Works
 Monument commemorating the French Revolution, Châtellerault (Vienna), 1890
 two figural groups on the supports of Pont de Bir-Hakeim in Paris, circa 1900
 Monument to Jules Ferry and Autumn, the Jardin des Tuileries in Paris, 1910
 1924 Medal Occupation of the Ruhr.

Gallery

References 

 Monuments and Maidens:  the Allegory of the Female Form, Marina Warner, Vintage, 1996

External links

 

1851 births
1924 deaths
20th-century French sculptors
19th-century French sculptors
French male sculptors
19th-century French male artists